Minneapolis City Hall and Hennepin County Courthouse (also known as the Municipal Building), designed by Long and Kees in 1888, is the main building used by the city government of Minneapolis, as well as by Hennepin County, in the U.S. state of Minnesota. The structure has served as mainly local government offices since it was built, and today the building is 60 percent occupied by the city and 40 percent occupied by the County.  The building is jointly owned by the city and county and managed by the Municipal Building Commission. The Commission consists of the chair of the County Board, the mayor of the City of Minneapolis, a member of the County Board and a member of the Minneapolis City Council. The County Board chair serves as the president of the Commission and the mayor serves as the vice president. The building bears a striking resemblance to the city hall buildings in Cincinnati and Toronto. The City Hall and Courthouse was added to the National Register of Historic Places in 1974.

Architecture

The building replaced an earlier City Hall that existed from 1873 until 1912 near the old intersection between Hennepin Avenue and Nicollet Avenue. That structure eventually was razed to make way for Gateway Park, which continues to occupy part of the old City Hall site.  The building also replaced an earlier courthouse and also the earlier Hennepin County Jail, which was located where U.S. Bank Stadium currently stands.

Before the construction of the original City Hall in 1873, city government officials worked out of rented space in the Pence Opera House building, located at Hennepin Avenue and 2nd Street.

The building, located at 350 South Fifth Street, is an example of Richardsonian Romanesque architecture. The design is based upon Henry Hobson Richardson's Allegheny County Courthouse in Pittsburgh, Pennsylvania.  Washington School, the first schoolhouse in Minneapolis west of the Mississippi River, was demolished to make way for the new building.  Groundbreaking took place in 1889, and the cornerstone was laid (a story off the ground) in 1891.   Construction did not officially end until 1906, although the structural exterior was essentially complete by the end of 1895.   The county began moving in to its side (4th Ave.) in November 1895, while the city (3rd Ave.) side was not occupied until December 1902.  Cost was about $3,554,000, which works out to 28¢ per cubic foot ($10/m3).When constructed, the building claimed to have the world's largest four-faced chiming clock. At 24 feet, 6 inches (just under  meters), the faces are 18 inches (45.7 cm) wider than those of the Great Clock in London (which houses the famous hour bell Big Ben). The tower housing the clock reaches 345 feet (105 m) in height, and was the tallest structure in the city until the 1920s when the Foshay Tower was built. A 15-bell chime in the tower is played regularly, with noontime concerts provided to the public on holidays and on Fridays and certain Sundays during the warm months. The chime was originally 10 bells, and it was first played on March 10, 1896.

The building is built of rose granite quarried in Ortonville, with many stones greater than 20 tonnes in weight. The granite was originally only going to be used for the foundation of the building, with brick used for the upper portion. However, the public appreciated the appearance of the foundation so much that they lobbied for the entire building to be made of granite. This may be a reason for the significant cost overruns — it was originally expected to cost only $1.15 million.

Unlike most buildings in downtown Minneapolis, there are no "skyways" connecting the city hall to the rest of the city. Since exterior alterations are not allowed for buildings on the National Register of Historic Places, tunnels were constructed instead.  Public pedestrian tunnels connect the building to the Hennepin County Government Center under 5th Street, and to the U.S. Courthouse under 4th Street.  There are also restricted tunnels for use by the sheriff connecting under 4th Avenue to the Hennepin County Jail and to the Government Center.  The METRO Blue and Green light rail lines have a stop on the south side of the building: the Government Plaza station.

Interior 
Inside, on the 4th Street side, there is a large five-story rotunda including a large sculpture, "Father of Waters," by American sculptor Larkin Goldsmith Mead who lived in Florence, Italy at the time. According to legend, rubbing his big toe brings good luck. It was placed inside the building in 1906.

Originally, the building had a red terracotta roof, but it began leaking so a copper roof was installed. At 180,000 pounds (81.6 t), it was said to be the largest in the country. The copper has since acquired its characteristic green patina.
Over the years, some of the larger spaces in the building were subdivided to make more office space. In the 1940s and 1950s, the city built a mezzanine floor over its side of the 3rd floor, and the county built an annex building on its side of the courtyard. In 1981, a committee plan recommended converting some of the spaces back to their original design and that other spaces be converted to a more open design with offices fronting onto the courtyard instead of the current corridors.  The plan also called for the annex building in the courtyard to be demolished, the courtyard domed, and the Father of Waters sculpture moved in there.  Many of these aspects of the plan were rejected, although restoration of certain historic spaces has been completed.

See also
Minneapolis City Council
List of tallest buildings in Minnesota
List of tallest buildings in Minneapolis

References

Steve Ristuben and William Scott (1981). HABS/HAER MN-30 documentation. National Park Service/Library of Congress. Accessed September 19, 2004.
More images. Public images. Images from flickr.

External links

Tower Bell Foundation non-profit group that produces concerts on the chime

Bell towers in the United States
Buildings and structures in Minneapolis
City and town halls in Minnesota
Clock towers in Minnesota
County courthouses in Minnesota
Courthouses on the National Register of Historic Places in Minnesota
Government buildings completed in 1909
City and town halls on the National Register of Historic Places in Minnesota
National Register of Historic Places in Minneapolis
Richardsonian Romanesque architecture in Minnesota
Rotundas (architecture)
Skyscraper office buildings in Minneapolis
Towers completed in 1896